Glyn Shane Roberts (born 19 October 1974) is an English footballer who played as a midfielder.

Career
In 1993, Roberts signed for Rotherham United, after spending time in the youth set-up at Norwich City. Roberts made 16 Football League appearances at Rotherham, scoring once. Following his spell at Rotherham, Roberts dropped into non-League football, signing for Chelmsford City. In 1997, Roberts joined King's Lynn. In November 1998, following becoming surplus to requirements at King's Lynn, Roberts signed for Diss Town. In 2001, Roberts joined hometown club Ipswich Wanderers, before joining Clacton Town a few months later in December 2001. In 2002, Roberts joined Stowmarket Town. In 2005, following a period out of the game, Roberts signed for newly promoted Eastern Counties League club Debenham LC.

References

1974 births
Living people
Association football midfielders
Sportspeople from Ipswich
English footballers
Rotherham United F.C. players
Chelmsford City F.C. players
King's Lynn F.C. players
Diss Town F.C. players
Ipswich Wanderers F.C. players
F.C. Clacton players
Stowmarket Town F.C. players
Debenham LC F.C. players
English Football League players
Southern Football League players